William Foley may refer to:

 William Foley (American football), former American football coach
 William Foley (artist) (1926–2020), American artist
 William Foley (bishop) (1931–1991), Australian bishop and Archbishop
 William Foley (cricketer) (1906–1963), South African cricketer
 William A. Foley (born 1949), American linguist
 William Brown Foley (1855–1916), baseball player
 William R. Foley (1908–1988), American politician
 Bill Foley, American photojournalist
 William P. Foley II (born 1944), American businessman; chairman of Fidelity National Financial and owner of the Vegas Golden Knights
 Brian Foley (hymnist) (William Brian Foley, 1919–2000), Roman Catholic priest and hymnodist
 William J. Foley (1887–1952), American attorney and politician
 William Foley (priest) (1854–1944), Archdeacon of Ardfert 
 Will Foley (footballer) (born 1960), Scottish footballer